Hugh VI may refer to:

 Hugh VI of Lusignan (c. 1039/1043–1102)
 Hugh VI, Viscount of Châteaudun (died 1191)